Pierrefitte-en-Cinglais is a commune in the Calvados department in the Normandy region in northwestern France.

The town lies 13 miles from the foot of the hill St. Clair, which rises to 306 meters.

Population

See also
Communes of the Calvados department

References

Communes of Calvados (department)
Calvados communes articles needing translation from French Wikipedia